Gamma  (uppercase , lowercase  ;  gámma) is the third letter of the Greek alphabet. In the system of Greek numerals it has a value of 3. In Ancient Greek, the letter gamma represented a voiced velar stop . In Modern Greek, this letter represents either a voiced velar fricative  or a voiced palatal fricative  (while /g/ in foreign words is instead commonly transcribed as γκ).

In the International Phonetic Alphabet and other modern Latin-alphabet based phonetic notations, it represents the voiced velar fricative.

History

The Greek letter Gamma Γ is a grapheme derived from the Phoenician letter  (gīml) which was rotated from the right-to-left script of Canaanite to accommodate the Greek language's writing system of left-to-right. The Canaanite grapheme represented the /g/ phoneme in the Canaanite language, and as such is cognate with gimel ג of the Hebrew alphabet.

Based on its name, the letter has been interpreted as an abstract representation of a camel's neck, but this has been criticized as contrived, and it is more likely that the letter is derived from an Egyptian hieroglyph representing a club or throwing stick.

In Archaic Greece, the shape of gamma was closer to a classical lambda (Λ), while lambda retained the Phoenician L-shape.

Letters that arose from the Greek gamma include Etruscan (Old Italic) 𐌂,  Roman C and G, Runic kaunan , Gothic geuua , the Coptic Ⲅ, and the Cyrillic letters Г and Ґ.

Greek phoneme

The Ancient Greek /g/ phoneme was the voiced velar stop, continuing the reconstructed proto-Indo-European *g, *ǵ.

The modern Greek phoneme represented by gamma is realized either as a voiced palatal fricative before a front vowel (/e/, /i/), or as a voiced velar fricative  in all other environments. Both in Ancient and in Modern Greek, before other velar consonants (κ, χ, ξ k, kh, ks), gamma represents a velar nasal .

Phonetic transcription
Lowercase Greek gamma is used in the Americanist phonetic notation and Uralic Phonetic Alphabet to indicate voiced consonants.

The gamma was also added to the Latin alphabet, as Latin gamma, in the following forms: majuscule Ɣ, minuscule ɣ, and superscript modifier letter ˠ.

In the International Phonetic Alphabet the minuscule letter is used to represent a voiced velar fricative and the superscript modifier letter is used to represent velarization. It is not to be confused with  the character , which looks like a lowercase Latin gamma that lies above the baseline rather than crossing, and which represents the close-mid back unrounded vowel. In certain nonstandard variations of the IPA, the uppercase form is used.

It is as a full-fledged majuscule and minuscule letter in the alphabets of some of languages of Africa such as Dagbani, Dinka, Kabye, and Ewe, and Berber languages using the Berber Latin alphabet.

It is sometimes also used in the romanization of Pashto.

Mathematics and science

Lowercase
The lowercase letter  is used as a symbol for:
Chromatic number of in graph theory
Gamma radiation in nuclear physics
The photon, the elementary particle of light and other electromagnetic radiation
The 434 nm spectral line in the Balmer series
Surface energy in materials science
The Lorentz factor in the theory of relativity
In mathematics, the lower incomplete gamma function
The heat capacity ratio Cp&hairsp;&hairsp;/Cv in thermodynamics
The activity coefficient in thermodynamics
The gyromagnetic ratio in electromagnetism
Gamma waves in neuroscience
Gamma motor neurons in neuroscience
A non-SI metric unit of measure of mass equal to one microgram (1 μg). This always-rare use is currently deprecated.
A non-SI unit of measure of magnetic flux density, sometimes used in geophysics, equal to 1 nanotesla (nT).
The power by which the luminance of an image is increased in gamma correction
The Euler–Mascheroni constant ≈ 0.57721566490153286
In civil and mechanical engineering:
Specific weight
The shear rate of a fluid is represented by a lowercase gamma with a dot above it: 
Austenite (also known as γ-iron), a metallic non-magnetic allotrope or solid solution of iron.
The gamma carbon, the third carbon attached to a functional group in organic chemistry and biochemistry; see Alpha and beta carbon

The lowercase Latin gamma ɣ  can also be used in contexts (such as chemical or molecule nomenclature) where gamma must not be confused with the letter y, which can occur in some computer typefaces.

Uppercase
The uppercase letter  is used as a symbol for:
In mathematics, the gamma function (usually written as -function) is an extension of the factorial to complex numbers
In mathematics, the upper incomplete gamma function
The Christoffel symbols in differential geometry
In probability theory and statistics, the gamma distribution is a two-parameter family of continuous probability distributions.
In solid-state physics, the center of the Brillouin zone
Circulation in fluid mechanics
As reflection coefficient in physics and electrical engineering
The tape alphabet of a Turing machine
The Feferman–Schütte ordinal 
One of the Greeks in mathematical finance

Meteorology

Tropical cyclones 
The name Gamma has been used twice for tropical cyclones:

Tropical Storm Gamma (2005) - deadly tropical storm that impacted Honduras

Hurricane Gamma (2020) - hurricane that affected the Yucatan Peninsula

Encoding

HTML
The HTML entities for uppercase and lowercase gamma are &Gamma; and &gamma;.

Unicode

 Greek Gamma

 Coptic Gamma

 Latin Gamma / phonetic Gamma

 CJK Square Gamma

 Technical / Mathematical Gamma

These characters are used only as mathematical symbols. Stylized Greek text should be encoded using the normal Greek letters, with markup and formatting to indicate text style.

See also

 Г, г - Ge (Cyrillic)
 G, g - Latin
 Gamma correction
 Gammadion – symbol that appears to look like a swastika, but pre-dates the Nazi Hakenkreuz (Hooked-Cross)

References

Greek letters
Gz